Quest for the Lost City is a 1955 American documentary film which follows the travels of the travel writing team of Dana and Ginger Lamb, as they hike through the jungles of Central America. Produced by Sol Lesser Productions, it was distributed by RKO Radio Pictures, and released on May 4, 1955.  The film features an introduction by Heisman Trophy winner Tom Harmon, who used a survival kit developed by the Lambs during his days as an Army Air Force pilot during World War II.  The film is based on the autobiographical book by the Lambs, entitled Enchanted Vagabonds.

See also
List of American films of 1955

References

External links

1955 films
American documentary films
1955 documentary films
Documentary films about Latin America
Travelogues
Films produced by Sol Lesser
RKO Pictures films
Films scored by Paul Sawtell
1950s English-language films
1950s American films